Someone To Dance With is the second solo album by Irish musician Sonny Condell. It was released in 1994 by STARC.

Track listing

Personnel
Sonny Condell – guitars, vocals, backing vocals on tracks 4, 7, 9, 10, 11 and 12, synthesizer on tracks 1, 2, 6 and 13, saxophone Casio Digital and piano Yamaha on "Someone to Dance With", percussion on "Guilty" and "Dream Sequence", mixing
Máire Breatnach – additional vocals on "Almond Skin" and "Downrunning", backing vocals on tracks 2, 3, 7 and 13, viola on "Almond Skin" and "Forever Frozen", synthesizer on "Ocean Floor" and "Old Kowloon", spoons on "Someone To Dance With", strings on tracks 3, 5, 6, 9, 10, 11, 12 and 13, piano on "Groundown", mixing
Robbie Casserly – drums, percussion, guitar on "Pink Promenade"
Paul Moore – bass guitar, double bass on "Street Sweeper"
Cormac Breatnach – tin whistle on tracks 3, 7, 9, 12 and 13
Greg Boland – guitars on "Old Poet"
Philip King – harmonica on tracks 7, 8 and 11
Robbie Overson – guitars on "Forever Frozen"
John Whelan – guitars on "Ocean Floor" and "Groundown"
Máire Brennan – additional vocals on tracks 1,6 and 12
Alan Connaughton – engineering, mixing
Brian Narty – engineering
Ciarán Byrne – engineering

Release history

References

1994 albums
Sonny Condell albums